Miron Muslic (born 14 September 1982) is a Bosnian-Austrian professional football coach and a former player who played as a forward. He is currently manager of Belgian club Cercle Brugge.

Coaching career
On 14 July 2020, he was hired as a manager by Austrian Football Second League club Floridsdorfer AC.

References

External links 

Living people
1982 births 
Austrian footballers
Association football forwards
People from Bihać
Bosnia and Herzegovina emigrants to Austria
Austrian people of Bosnia and Herzegovina descent
Austrian Football Bundesliga players
FC Tirol Innsbruck players
SV Wörgl players
NK Novalja players
SV Ried players
SV Gmunden players
Austrian football managers
Floridsdorfer AC managers
SV Ried managers
Cercle Brugge K.S.V. managers
Austrian expatriate football managers
Expatriate football managers in Belgium
Austrian expatriate sportspeople in Belgium
Austrian expatriate sportspeople in Croatia
Austrian expatriate footballers
Expatriate footballers in Croatia